Haliti is a surname. Notable people with the surname include:

Ahmet Haliti (born 1988), Albanian footballer
Arber Haliti (born 1992), Albanian footballer 
Bajram Haliti (born 1955), Kosovar writer and journalist
Eusebio Haliti (born 1991), Italian sprinter and hurdler
Labinot Haliti (born 1985), Australian soccer player
Xhavit Haliti (born 1956), Kosovar Albanian politician